Sax for Stax is the thirteenth studio album by  Saxophonist Gerald Albright issued in 2008 by Peak Records. The album rose to No. 4 on the Billboard Contemporary Jazz Albums chart, No. 7 on the Billboard Jazz Albums chart and No. 24 on the Billboard Top R&B/Hip-Hop Albums chart.

Critical reception

Sax for Stax was nominated for Best Pop Instrumental Album at the 51st Annual Grammy Awards in 2009.

Track listing

 "Theme from "The Men"" (Isaac Hayes) - 5:08
 "Knock on Wood" (Eddie Floyd, Steve Cropper) -4:04
 "Never Can Say Goodbye" (Clifton Davis) - 4:17 (Featuring Will Downing)
 "Memphis Passion" (Gerald Albright) - 4:54
 "Respect Yourself" (Luther Ingram, Mack Rice) - 5:05 (featuring Ledisi)
 "I Stand Accused" (William Butler, Jerry Butler) - 5:11
 "Cheaper to Keep Her" (Mack Rice) - 4:22
 "Walkin' Down Beale Street" (Gerald Albright) - 4:30
 "What You See Is What You Get" (Tony Hester) - 4:50 (featuring Philip Bailey)
 "Who's Making Love?" (Bettye Crutcher, Don Davis, Homer Banks, Raymond Jackson) - 4:16
 "W.C. Handy Hop" (Gerald Albright) - 4:36

Personnel 
 Gerald Albright – alto saxophone, baritone saxophone, tenor saxophone, arrangements (1, 3, 4, 7, 8, 11), flute (3, 4. 6), percussion (4, 11), bass (6, 8), vocal arrangements (6), horn arrangements (10)
 Tracy Carter – keyboards (1, 2, 3, 5, 7-11)
 Rex Rideout – keyboards (2, 5, 6, 9, 10), arrangements (2, 5, 6, 9, 10)
 Arlington Jones – keyboards (4)
 Errol Cooney – guitars (1)
 Rick Watford – acoustic guitar (4), electric guitar (4), guitars (8, 11)
 Darrell Crooks – guitars (6)
 Melvin Lee Davis – bass (1, 2, 3, 5, 7, 9, 10)
 Teddy Campbell – drums 
 Lenny Castro – percussion (1, 2, 3, 5-10)
 Kirk Whalum – tenor saxophone (8)
 Mark Cargill – strings (1, 3, 6, 9), string arrangements (1, 3, 6, 9)
 Will Downing – vocals (3)
 Ledisi – vocals (5)
 Selina Albright – backing vocals (6)
 Philip Bailey – vocals (9)
 Mabvuto Carpenter – additional backing vocals (9)

Production 
 Andi Howard – executive producer 
 Mark Wexler – executive producer 
 Gerald Albright – producer (1, 3, 4, 7, 8, 11), recording 
 Rex Rideout – producer (2, 5, 6, 9, 10), recording 
 Marc Green – recording 
 Steve Sykes – recording 
 Josh Blanchard – assistant engineer 
 Seth Presant – assistant engineer
 Don Murray – mixing 
 Eric Boulanger – mastering 
 Sangwook "Sunny" Nam – mastering 
 Valerie Ince – label coordinator 
 Yvonne Wish – project coordinator 
 Sonny Mediana – cover design, package design 
 Carl Studna – photography 
 George Duke – liner notes 
 Ross Moss – management 
 Chapman Management – management

Studios
 Recorded at Castle Oaks Productions (Calabasas, California); KAR Studios (Sherman Oaks, California); Bright Music Studios (Moonpark, California); CCI Media (Torrance, California); The Green Room (London, UK).
 Mixed at G Studio Digital (Studio City, California); The Firehouse (San Francisco, California).
 Mastered at The Mastering Lab (Ojai, California).

References

2008 albums
Peak Records albums